A1(M) is the designation given to a series of four separate motorway sections in England. Each section is an upgrade to a section of the A1, a major north–south road which connects London, the capital of England, with Edinburgh, the capital of Scotland. The first section, the Doncaster Bypass, opened in 1961 and is one of the oldest sections of motorway in Britain. Construction of a new section of A1(M) between Leeming and Barton was completed on 29 March 2018, a year later than the anticipated opening in 2017 due to extensive archaeological excavations.  Its completion linked the Barton to Washington section with the Darrington to Leeming Bar section, forming the longest A1(M) section overall and reducing the number of sections from five to four.

In 2015, a proposal was made by three local government organizations to renumber as M1 the section of A1(M) between Micklefield and Washington, making this section a northern extension of the M1.

Overview 

From London to Sunderland,  of the route are non-motorway while the remaining  are to motorway standards.

The motorway sections are discussed below.

South Mimms to Stotfold

This section opened in stages:
Junctions 1 to 2 opened in 1979
Junctions 2 to 4 opened in 1986
Junctions 4 to 6 opened in 1973
Junctions 6 to 8 opened in 1962
Junctions 8 to 10 opened in 1967

Junctions

Alconbury to Peterborough

This section runs through the Cambridgeshire countryside between Alconbury and Peterborough. It was officially opened by Lord Whitty on 31 October 1998, and is the most isolated of the motorway sections as it connects with no other motorway. It is designed to a noticeably high standard,  of it being four lanes from junction 14 at Alconbury to junction 16 at Norman Cross in each direction whilst the remainder has three lanes in each direction. It is managed by Road Management Services (Peterborough) under a DBFO contract with National Highways.

Junctions
Following the rerouting of the A14 road in 2019 at Brampton Hut interchange this section needs review.

Doncaster By-Pass (Blyth to Skellow)

This  section which runs from Skellow in South Yorkshire to the village of Blyth in the far north of Nottinghamshire first opened in 1961 and was one of the first sections of motorway to be built in Britain; it has two lanes in each direction. Between junction 36 and 37 the motorway crosses the River Don on the Don Bridge.

Junctions
Data from driver location signs are used to provide distance and carriageway identifier information.

Skellow to Darrington (proposed) 

Proposals were made by a previous government to upgrade the Skellow to Darrington section of the A1 to motorway, meaning the entire stretch of A1 from Blyth in Nottinghamshire to Washington in Tyne and Wear would be motorway-standard road.

Darrington to Washington

This section opened in sections:
Walshford to 49 opened in 1995
Junctions 43 to 44 opened in 1999
When this section opened it ended at a temporary terminus south of the M1. There was a final exit into Micklefield Village for non-motorway traffic onto what is now the access road. During the first week of June 2009, junctions 44 and 45 were renumbered to 43 and 44.  At the same time the existing A1/A659 Grange Moor junction became A1(M) junction 45. As a result many atlases show incorrect junction numbering for this stretch of motorway.
Junction 46 to temporary junction at Walshford opened in 2005
Junction 40 to south of 43 opened in 2005 and 2006
The northern section of the upgrade, bypassing Fairburn village, opened to traffic in April 2005 with a temporary connection with the existing A1 between Fairburn and Brotherton. The southern section, with a free-flow interchange with the M62 motorway, opened to traffic on 13 January 2006.
Junctions 44 to 46 opened in 2009
Junctions 49 to 51 opened in 2011 and 2012
Work began in March 2009 to upgrade the Dishforth to Leeming section to dual three-lane motorway standard with existing connections being replaced by two new junctions. The Dishforth to Baldersby Section  was completed in October 2011  and the Baldersby to Leeming section  was opened to traffic on 31 March 2012.
Junctions 51 to 56 opened in 2017 and 2018 - there are no junctions 54 and 55
Work on upgrading the Leeming Bar to Barton section to three-lane motorway began in April 2014. Work was expected to be completed by summer 2017. In early 2017, the Highways Agency announced that the full opening would be delayed until December 2017. In the end, the motorway opened up on 29 March 2018, making the A1 continuous motorway standard from Darrington, West Yorkshire, to Washington, Tyne and Wear, though residual works were still to be completed.
 Junctions 56 to 59 opened in 1965
 Junctions 59 to 63 opened in 1969
 Junctions 63 to 65 opened in 1970

Junctions
Data from driver location signs are used to provide distance and carriageway identifier information.

References

External links

 CBRD Motorway Database – A1(M)
The Motorway Archive (A1(M))
Junctions 1 to 10 & 14 to 17
Junctions 34 to 38
Junctions 47 to 49
Junctions 56 to 59
Junctions 59 to 63
Junctions 63 to 65
 Pathetic Motorways: A1(M) Central Motorway East

Motorways in England
A1 road (Great Britain)